Jan Svendsen (born November 9, 1948) is an American athlete. She competed in the women's shot put at the 1972 Summer Olympics.

References

External links
 

1948 births
Living people
Athletes (track and field) at the 1972 Summer Olympics
Athletes (track and field) at the 1975 Pan American Games
American female shot putters
Olympic track and field athletes of the United States
Place of birth missing (living people)
Pan American Games track and field athletes for the United States
21st-century American women